Clay Daniel Wilson (born April 5, 1983) is an American former professional ice hockey defenseman. He played 36 games in the National Hockey League (NHL) for the Columbus Blue Jackets, Atlanta Thrashers, Florida Panthers and Calgary Flames.

Playing career

Clay Wilson played collegiate hockey for Michigan Tech from 2001 until 2005. After the 2004–05 collegiate season ended, he turned professional with the Muskegon Fury of the UHL. He played parts of two seasons with Muskegon before joining the Grand Rapids Griffins of the AHL. After the 2005–06 season, he was signed as a free agent by the Anaheim Ducks of the NHL. He played for the Ducks' AHL affiliate, the Portland Pirates before being traded to the Columbus Blue Jackets of the NHL in November 2007.

Wilson made his NHL debut with the Blue Jackets on March 25, 2008, against the Nashville Predators. He scored his first NHL goal and assist on March 26, 2008 in a game against the Chicago Blackhawks, earning him first star honors in only his second NHL game. On January 14, 2009, Wilson was traded by the Blue Jackets, along with a 6th round draft pick, to the Atlanta Thrashers for Jason Williams.

Wilson signed a two-year, two-way contract with the Florida Panthers on July 2, 2009. Wilson was then assigned to AHL affiliate, the Rochester Americans, for the majority of the 2009–10 season before making his Panthers debut on April 3, 2010 against the New York Rangers. Although appearing in only two NHL games, Clay scored an impressive 60 points in 75 games with the Americans to be named to the AHL's Second All-Star Team.

The Calgary Flames signed Wilson to a two-way deal for the 2011–12 season.  He spent the majority of it with the Abbotsford Heat of the AHL, but appeared in five games with Calgary.  He had a one-way deal with the Flames for 2012–13, but was expected to again spend most of the season in Abbotsford.  Wilson instead chose to leave the Flames organization, signing with HC Donbass of the Kontinental Hockey League (KHL). The Flames terminated his NHL contract. He won the 2012–13 IIHF Continental Cup with HC Donbass and was named the best defender in the tournament. He was named best defender again in 2014.

Wilson was re-signed by Donbass to a further two-year contract extension, however with civil unrest in Ukraine forcing Donbass to suspend operations for the 2014–15 season, Wilson signed a one-year contract with expansion club, HC Sochi on July 1, 2014. He then had his contract renewed for a second season. Following the 2015-16 campaign, he left Sochi, moving on to fellow KHL outfit Severstal Cherepovets.

After moving to Sweden to play in the HockeyAllsvenskan with AIK IF for the 2017–18 season, Wilson ended his 13-year professional career in accepting an assistant coach role in a return to Donbas, Ukraine, with HC Donbass on October 16, 2018.

Career statistics

Regular season and playoffs

International

References

External links

1983 births
Living people
AIK IF players
American men's ice hockey defensemen
Atlanta Thrashers players
Calgary Flames players
Chicago Wolves players
Columbus Blue Jackets players
HC Donbass players
Florida Panthers players
Grand Rapids Griffins players
Ice hockey players from Minnesota
Michigan Tech Huskies men's ice hockey players
Muskegon Fury players
People from Pine County, Minnesota
Portland Pirates players
Rochester Americans players
Severstal Cherepovets players
HC Sochi players
Syracuse Crunch players
Undrafted National Hockey League players